Lu Tongjuan (born 10 March 1990) is a Chinese judoka. She competed at the World Judo Championships in 2017, 2018 and 2019.

In 2021, she won one of the bronze medals in her event at the 2021 Judo Grand Slam Antalya held in Antalya, Turkey. A few days later, she won the gold medal in her event at the 2021 Asian-Pacific Judo Championships held in Bishkek, Kyrgyzstan.

She competed in the women's 57 kg event at the 2020 Summer Olympics held in Tokyo, Japan.

References

External links
 

Living people
1990 births
People from Zhaoqing
Chinese female judoka
Judoka at the 2018 Asian Games
Asian Games competitors for China
Judoka at the 2020 Summer Olympics
Olympic judoka of China
21st-century Chinese women